Navahrudak Mosque is a wooden mosque located in Novogrudok, Grodno Region in Belarus. 

It was the largest Lipka Tatar mosque in the Second Polish Republic. Following the 22 September 1929, it was the first mosque to be visited by a Polish senior state official - the Polish president, Ignacy Mościcki.

Following the Second World War, the mosque was transformed into a residential building (the minaret and tower was destroyed). During the nineteen-nineties, there were increasing efforts to rebuild the Tatar mosque. The mosque was reopened in 1997.

See also
 Islam in Belarus
 Kruszyniany Mosque, Lipka Tatar mosque in Poland
 Raižiai Mosque, Lipka Tatar mosque in Lithuania

References

Lipka Tatar mosques
Mosques in Belarus
Mosques completed in 1796